Dean Ouellet (born August 5, 1987) is a Canadian professional ice hockey forward currently with Rivière-du-Loup 3L of the LNAH.

Playing career
Ouellet played four seasons (2004-2008) of major junior hockey in the Quebec Major Junior Hockey League with the Cape Breton Screaming Eagles. He then attended the University of Moncton where he played four seasons (2008-2012) of CIS college hockey in the AUS conference. In his fourth year, Ouellet was recognized for his outstanding play when he was named to the AUS First All-Star Team.

On September 12, 2012, Ouellet signed with the San Francisco Bulls of ECHL, and he made team history when, on October 12, 2012, he scored the very first goal for the new ECHL team in their very first regular season game. The rookie was selected by his team their representative in the 2012–13 ECHL All-Star Game.

On June 21, 2013, as an impending free agent Ouellet joined former Bulls teammate, Jordan Morrison in signing a one-year contract abroad in the Kazakhstan Hockey Championship with Arystan Temirtau. However, on October 2, 2013, before the start of the 2013–14 ECHL season, both Morrison and Ouellet were able to come to terms with the San Francisco Bulls and returned to the team.

On January 27, 2014 the San Francisco Bulls announced they were ceasing operations effective immediately, leaving Ouellet and all players on an ECHL contract with San Francisco as free agents. He then signed for the remainder of the season with the Fort Wayne Komets.

After a full season abroad in the French Ligue Magnus with LHC Les Lions, Ouellet returned to the ECHL and signed for the 2015–16 season with the Fort Wayne Komets on June 16, 2015. Ouellet was limited to 8 games with the Komets due to injury before he was traded to fellow ECHL club, the Norfolk Admirals on January 5, 2016.

Career statistics

Regular season and playoffs

International

Awards and honours

References

External links

1987 births
Living people
Acadian people
Arystan Temirtau players
Canadian ice hockey centres
Cape Breton Screaming Eagles players
Fort Wayne Komets players
Hamilton Bulldogs (AHL) players
Ice hockey people from New Brunswick
Norfolk Admirals (ECHL) players
People from Edmundston
San Francisco Bulls players